Randall G. Wiebe is a playwright, stage actor, voice actor, artistic director, creative director, chaplain, art instructor, and artist living in Rosebud, Alberta, Canada. He was born in Morden, Manitoba, and was the artistic director for the Canadian Badlands Passion Play, a production that he says includes "professionals and people that have never been on stage before." He has also acted in the play, portraying characters as diverse as Jairus, Barrabas, Bartimaeus, Judas and Jesus. Originally the playwright for the Passion Play, he has since been variously the play's artistic director, creative director and chaplain from 2006 to 2012. Wiebe also wrote his own 55-minute, one-man Passion play called Thomas: Confessions of a Doubter and has performed this play more than 350 times, mostly in Western Canada, but also in Malaysia, Guam, Hawaii and Venezuela from 2002 to 2012. As a voice actor, he has acted in Hunter × Hunter, Mega Man Powered Up and Mega Man X8, portraying such characters as Dr. Light. Wiebe is a visual art instructor at the Rosebud School of the Arts in Rosebud, Alberta and graphic design instructor at Prairie College in Three Hills, Alberta.

References

Living people
Year of birth missing (living people)
21st-century Canadian dramatists and playwrights
21st-century Canadian male actors
Male actors from Alberta
Male actors from Saskatchewan
Canadian art educators
Artistic directors
Canadian chaplains
Canadian Christian clergy
Canadian Mennonites
Mennonite writers
21st-century Canadian painters
Canadian male painters
Canadian male stage actors
Canadian male voice actors
Writers from Alberta
Writers from Saskatchewan
Canadian theatre directors
Canadian male dramatists and playwrights
21st-century Canadian male writers